The 2019 U.S. Classic, known as the 2019 GK U.S. Classic for sponsorship reasons, is the 36th edition of the U.S. Classic gymnastics tournament. The competition was held on July 20, 2019, at the KFC Yum! Center in Louisville, Kentucky.

Medalists

Participants

Seniors

 Shania Adams – Plain City, Ohio (Buckeye Gymnastics)
 Simone Biles – Spring, Texas (World Champions Centre)
 Sloane Blakely – Frisco, Texas (WOGA)
 Jade Carey – Phoenix, Arizona (Arizona Sunrays)
 Jordan Chiles – Spring, Texas (World Champions Centre)
 Kara Eaker – Grain Valley, Missouri (GAGE)
 Aleah Finnegan – Lee's Summit, Missouri (GAGE)
 Jaylene Gilstrap – McKinney, Texas (Metroplex Gymnastics)
 Olivia Hollingsworth – Seabrook, Texas (World Champions Centre)
 Morgan Hurd – Middletown, Delaware (First State Gymnastics)
 Alexis Jeffrey – Warrensburg, Missouri (GAGE)
 Shilese Jones – Westerville, Ohio (Future Gymnastics)
 Emily Lee – Los Gatos, California (West Valley Gymnastics)
 Sunisa Lee – St. Paul, Minnesota (Midwest Gymnastics)
 Emma Malabuyo – Flower Mound, Texas (Texas Dreams Gymnastics)
 Grace McCallum – Isanti, Minnesota (Twin City Twisters)
 Riley McCusker – Brielle, New Jersey (MG Elite)
 Victoria Nguyen – Sugar Land, Texas (Everest Gymnastics)
 Gabby Perea – Geneva, Illinois (Legacy Elite Gymnastics)
 MyKayla Skinner – Gilbert, Arizona (Desert Lights Gymnastics)
 Trinity Thomas – York, Pennsylvania (University of Florida Gymnastics)
 Faith Torrez – Pleasant Prairie, Wisconsin (Champions Centre)
 Abigael Vides – Spring, Texas (World Champions Centre)
 Leanne Wong – Overland Park, Kansas (GAGE)

Juniors 

 Olivia Ahern – Memphis, Tennessee (River City Gymnastics Inc)
 Ciena Alipio – San Jose, California (West Valley Gymnastics
 Sydney Barros – Woodstock, Georgia (Texas Dreams Gymnastics)
 Skye Blakely – Frisco, Texas (WOGA)
 Charlotte Booth – Clermont, Florida (Johnson's Global Gymnastics)
 Sophia Butler – Houston, Texas (Discover Gymnastics)
 Kailin Chio – Henderson, Nevada (Gymcats)
 Kayla DiCello – Boyds, Maryland (Hill's Gymnastics)
 Addison Fatta – Wrightsville, Pennsylvania (Prestige Gymnastics)
 eMjae Frazier – Erial, New Jersey (Parkettes)
 Elizabeth Gantner – Indianapolis, Indiana (Jaycie Phelps Athletic Center)
 Karis German – Spring, Texas (World Champions Center)
 Olivia Greaves – Staten Island, New York (MG Elite)
 Mia Heather – San Francisco, California (San Mateo Gymnastics)
 Julianne Huff – Hoover, Alabama (JamJev Gymnastics)
 Levi Jung-Ruivivar – Woodland Hills, California (Paramount Elite)
 Lilly Lippeatt – Mason, Ohio (Cincinnati Gymnastics)
 Lauren Little – Mooresville, North Carolina (Everest Gymnastics)
 Amber Lowe – Huntersville, North Carolina (Everest Gymnastics)
 Nola Matthews – Gilroy, California (Airborne Gymnastics)
 Konnor McClain – Cross Lanes, West Virginia (Revolution Gymnastics)
 Zoe Miller – Spring, Texas (World Champions Centre)
 Kaylen Morgan – Huntersville, North Carolina (Everest Gymanstics)
 Sydney Morris – Bowie, Maryland (First State Gymnastics)
 Annalise Newman-Achee – Brooklyn, New York (Chelsea Piers Gymnastics)
 Sophie Parenti – Menlo Park, California (San Mateo Gymnastics)
 Anya Pilgrim – Germantown, Maryland (Hill's Gymnastics)
 Ariel Posen – Manalapan, New Jersey (MG Elite)
 Joscelyn Roberson – Texarkana, Texas (North East Texas Elite Gymnastics)
 Sienna Robinson – Las Vegas, Nevada (Browns Gymanstics)
 Katelyn Rosen – Boerne, Texas (Mavericks at Artemovs)
 Lynden Saltness – Forest Lake, Minnesota (Midwest Gymnastics)
 Jamison Sears – Yorktown, Virginia (World Class Gymnastics)
 Chavala Shepard – Bentonville, Arkansas (Hopes and Dreams Gymnastics)
 Ava Siegfeldt – Hampton, Virginia (World Class Gymnastics)
 Eva Volpe – Pearland, Texas (Pearland Elite)
 Jamie Wright – Toano, Virginia (World Class Gymnastics)
 Ella Zirbes – Stillwater, Minnesota (Flips Gymnastics)

References 

U.S. Classic
U.S. Classic
2019 in sports in Kentucky